Café, con aroma de mujer ("Coffee, with the scent of a woman") is a 1994 Colombian telenovela produced by then programming company RCN Televisión on state-owned Canal A. It was created and written by Fernando Gaitán. It was broadcast in several countries throughout Latin America, North America and Europe.

Overview
Teresa Suárez (Margarita Rosa de Francisco), nicknamed "Gaviota" (Spanish for "Gull"), and her mother Carmenza Suárez, work as harvesters and throughout the year they travel to different farmlands across Colombia searching for work. Each October, just prior to the harvest period in the coffee axis, they travel to the hacienda Casablanca in Filandia whose owner, powerful coffee businessman Octavio Vallejo, secures employment for them. One October, Vallejo dies and his family, spread over the world, heads back to Casablanca to attend the funeral. Once back in the hacienda after several years in London, his grandson Sebastián Vallejo (Guy Ecker) meets Gaviota and only with her he is eventually able to overcome his fear of women.

After a few encounters, Sebastián and Gaviota begin a short, but passionate affair that becomes for both of them their first true romantic experience. They keep their romance a secret, specially from his aristocratic family, but eventually he must leave back for London after his grandfather's funeral to finish his college studies. The pair agree to reunite in Casablanca exactly the same date the following year, once he graduates, to finally marry. Shortly after Sebastián's departure, Gaviota finds out she is pregnant. Finding no means to get in contact with him, distrusting his family and with no one else to turn to, she decides to travel to Europe herself to search for him, having been deceived by a network of human trafficking who prey on her naivete by offering her a job as a model but actually hoping to exploit her as a prostitute in Paris.

Sebastián returns to Casablanca the following year to keep his promise and, after searching for her in town, he finds out she went to Europe to work as a prostitute. Disheartened, and influenced by his avaricious cousin Iván Vallejo (Cristóbal Errázuriz), he weds his friend Lucía Sandoval (Alejandra Borrero) who accepts a lifetime in a completely sexless marriage just to be by his side.

Gaviota, having assumed a new identity in Europe as Carolina Olivares, finally returns to Colombia but only manages to arrive at Casablanca the morning after Sebastián and Lucía's wedding ceremony has taken place there. Dismayed by the sudden turn of events, Gaviota looks for her mother and secretly leaves Casablanca for good in order to stay away from Sebastián and to find a better life in Bogotá. Having much difficulty in the huge and unfamiliar city she eventually returns to the world of coffee, this time being employed by Cafexport, the coffee-exporting company owned by the Vallejo family, under her alternate identity as Carolina Olivares. After realising Gaviota's return to Casablanca and her almost immediate departure, and also regretting his hasty and love-lacking marriage, Sebastián decides to employ all his means to find her. Lucía eventually finds out about his previous story with Gaviota and vows to keep her marriage and fight by thwarting his plans, while Iván and his wife Lucrecia (Sylvia de Dios) secretly plot to keep Sebastián and Gaviota apart in order to keep late Octavio Vallejo's wealth for themselves.

Impact
This telenovela marked a difference in Latin American telenovelas and the way they were created. The story involved both typical and modern parts of Colombia, taking place in the heart of Colombian coffee plantations, showing a panoramic and authentic view of the culture of Colombian coffee growers and the traditional heartland of Colombia's coffee-growing highlands, while also taking place in the capital city and providing an insight into the coffee business in an important coffee export company and the National Federation of Coffee Growers of Colombia.

In a short time, Café, con aroma de mujer became popular among audiences of all ages and genders, to the point that it became popularly told how the whole country would "come to a standstill" when the show came on the air on weeknights at 20:00. Its competition on Canal Uno was Las aguas mansas produced by RTI Colombia, which would be remade in 2003 as the successful Pasión de gavilanes.

The lead star Margarita Rosa de Francisco, already popular for her roles in Gallito Ramirez (1986) and Los Pecados de Inés de Hinojosa (1988) and for being a former Miss Colombia (second place in Miss World 1985), gave life to "Gaviota", one of the most popular characters in Colombian television and De Francisco's most important work.

Cast

Main cast
 Margarita Rosa de Francisco ... Teresa "Gaviota" Suárez / Carolina Olivares Maldonado
 Guy Ecker ... Sebastián Vallejo
 Alejandra Borrero ... Lucía Sandoval de Vallejo
 Cristóbal Errázuriz ... Iván Vallejo
 Sylvia de Dios ... Lucrecia Rivas de Vallejo
 Constanza Duque ... Carmenza Suárez

Supporting cast
 Sílvio Ángel ... Buitrago
 Juan Carlos Arango ... Aurelio
 Santiago Bejarano ... Miguel Alfonso Tejeiros de Caballero
 Óscar Borda ... Harold McLein
 Alejandro Buenaventura ... Roberto Avellaneda
 Manuel Busquets ... Jorge Latorre
 Gustavo Corredor ... Rafael Vallejo
 Juan Ángel ... Mauricio Salinas
 Luz Dary Beltrán ... Josefina
 Gloria Amparo Carmona ... Daniela
 Gerardo de Francisco ... Francisco Vallejo
 Kenny Delgado ... Víctor Ángel
 Myriam De Lourdes ... Ángela Sáenz de Vallejo
 Tania Fálquez ... Martha Benavides
 Danna García ... Marcela Vallejo Cortez
 Harry Geithner ... Dr. Carmona
 Claudia Liliana Gonzalez ... Daniela Reyes
 Jacqueline Henríquez ... Graciela
 Lina María Navia ... Paula Vallejo Cortez
 Haydee Ramírez ... Marcia Fontalvo
 Iván Rodríguez ... Reinaldo Pérez
 Andrei Satora ... Arthur
 Rey Vásquez ... El Galtero
 Guillermo Vives ... Bernardo Vallejo Sáenz
 Dora Cadavid ... Cecilia de Vallejo
 Bibiana Navas ... Matilde

Soundtrack
Gaviota
Aroma de mujer   - "Scent of a woman"
Entre dos fuegos   - "Between two fires"
Volveran las Obscuras Golondrinas   - "The dark swallows will return"
Mal Amor   - "Bad love"
Sangra un corazón   - "A heart bleeds"
A mi pesar   - "To my regret"
As de Corazones   - "Ace of hearts"
Como si nada   - "Like if nothing"
Como un cristal   - "Like a glass"
Vuelve   - "Come back"
Café café   - "Coffee - coffee"
 Ni soy río, ni soy flor   - "Neither am river, nor a flower"
 Chapolera
 Inquietud   - "Concern"

All tracks are sung by Margarita Rosa de Francisco with the exception of «Sangra un Corazón», sung by Argentinian singer Luis Andrés Penagos. The telenovela's opening credits feature «Gaviota», but its Argentinian broadcast used instead «Sin tí» by Donato y Estefano.

Remakes
Cafe con Aroma de Mujer was remade in Mexico twice. In 2001, TV Azteca first produced Cuando seas mía starring Silvia Navarro and Sergio Basañez as 'Paloma' and 'Diego'. In 2007, Televisa produced Destilando Amor with Angélica Rivera and Eduardo Yáñez, changing coffee for tequila.

In 2021, a different, modern version of Cafe con Aroma de Mujer has been remade by RCN Televisión, starring Laura Londoño and William Levy. All the soundtracks in the 2021 remake are performed by Laura Londoño herself.

International release

DVD release
There are no plans to release the telenovela on DVD. However, there are bootleg copies of the show on DVD.

Sources
Cronología del cine latinoamericano: 1990-2004 Original Spanish article.

See also
Café con aroma de mujer (2021 TV series)

References

External links

Argentinian fansite

1994 telenovelas
Colombian telenovelas
RCN Televisión telenovelas
Spanish-language telenovelas
1994 Colombian television series debuts
1995 Colombian television series endings
Television shows set in Bogotá